Sindh Technical Education & Vocational Training Authority (STEVTA) is a technical and vocational training authority founded by the Government of Sindh. It was established in 2009 to regulate the technical and vocational institutes of Sindh.

See also

Technical Education and Vocational Training Authority, Punjab
National Vocational and Technical Training Commission

References

External links
STEVTA official website

Vocational education in Pakistan
Government agencies of Sindh